Yogi Zohar Roth (born September 20, 1981) is a Pac-12 Networks college football analyst, filmmaker, and author.

Roth is a graduate of Lackawanna Trail Jr./Sr. High School in Factoryville, PA.

Roth began his collegiate career as an athlete at the University of Pittsburgh where he walked onto the football team, earning a full athletic scholarship as a wide receiver. His college roommate was Larry Fitzgerald. He then began a coaching career on the staff of Pete Carroll at USC. 

After graduating magna cum laude and earning his master's degree in communication management from the Annenberg School for Communication and Journalism, he rose through the coaching ranks, eventually becoming USC's assistant quarterbacks coach. After four years on the USC coaching staff he transitioned to media, where he began a career as a college football analyst and host for ESPN, Fox, and the Pac-12 Networks.

After pitching and producing his first documentary for ESPN, 3 for the show, which chronicled Jake Locker, Cam Newton and Tyrod Taylor's final season on the college gridiron and subsequent transition into the NFL, Roth became interested in storytelling.

He co-wrote the book, Win Forever (2010) with Pete Carroll, which reached #7 on the New York Times best-seller list, as well as his own book, From PA to LA (2010). In 2011, he was a producer on Depth Chart, an ESPN series that followed the Miami Hurricanes and their quarterbacks during training camp.

Roth also hosted and produced the Elite 11 documentary series for ESPN from 2009-2014 (which was nominated for an Emmy in 2013), and in 2015, directed Dear football: the 2015 Elite 11 story, which followed several high school quarterbacks on and off the field.

He currently serves as a producer and narrator on the Pac-12 Network's series The Drive, which follows a football program from the conference throughout a season.

Most recently, Roth made his directorial debut with the documentary feature film, Life in a Walk, which received the Outstanding Achievement in Filmmaking Award at the Newport Beach Film Festival. Life in a Walk follows Roth and his father, Will, on their trek along the Camino de Santiago, a famous pilgrimage through Portugal and Spain.

He is also the co-founder of Win Forever, LLC with Pete Carroll, which is an applied mindset training program for corporate leaders to develop a culture of high performance for individuals and teams to become the very best in their fields, and has formed a new production company, Life Without Limits.

Roth has been an on-air correspondent for Entertainment Tonight, is a regular on the speaking circuit for corporate, collegiate, and high school events (in 2013, he presented his first TEDx Talk, titled ‘Love Wins.’). Roth has acted in film and on television, appearing on Comedy Central, multiple national commercials, and in various independent films.

Roth resides in Venice Beach, CA.

References

External links
USC Bio

1981 births
Living people
American sports announcers
American television reporters and correspondents
American television sports anchors
American sports journalists
College football announcers
Pittsburgh Panthers football players
USC Trojans football coaches
American football wide receivers
Players of American football from Pennsylvania
USC Annenberg School for Communication and Journalism alumni
People from Wyoming County, Pennsylvania